Marc de Hemptinne (Ghent, 1902–1986) was a Belgian physicist. He was the son of Alexandre de Hemptinne, a professor at the University of Leuven. He studied chemistry at the University of Ghent and obtained a PhD in Science in 1926. Marc de Hemptinne was a pioneer of molecular spectroscopy. In 1948 he was awarded the Francqui Prize on Exact Sciences.

External links
 Marc de Hemptinne (in French)

1902 births
1986 deaths
Belgian physicists
Flemish scientists
Ghent University alumni